"Halfway Home" is a song co-written and recorded by Canadian country artist Jess Moskaluke. The song was co-written with Joseph Fox, Olivia Richardson, and Michael Whitworth, while Corey Crowder produced it. It was the second single from Moskaluke's 2021 studio album The Demos.

Background
Moskaluke described the track as "a song about being so in love you can’t stand the thought of being apart". She wrote the track several years prior to its release, and performed it live on several occasions with fans often requesting its official release.

Music video
The official music video was for "Halfway Home" premiered on April 14, 2020. The video showcases concert footage, as well as a behind-the-scenes look at Moskaluke and her band's touring life. She stated that she thought the video "captured the essence of who my band and I are both onstage and off".

Credits and personnel
Credits adapted from AllMusic.

 Jess Moskaluke – lead vocals, songwriting
 Adam Ayan – master engineering
 Corey Crowder — production, recording
 Warren David – mixing
 Joseph Fox - songwriting
 Alyson McAnally – production
 Dan Mikesell – mixing
 Sean Moffitt – mixing
 Olivia Richardson – songwriting
 Michael Whitworth – songwriting

Charts
"Halfway Home" reached a peak of #11 on the Billboard Canada Country chart, marking Moskaluke's thirteenth Top 20 hit. It also reached a peak of #4 on the TMN Country Hot 50 in Australia.

References

2020 songs
2020 singles
Jess Moskaluke songs
Songs written by Jess Moskaluke